St Thomas More Catholic School is a mixed Roman Catholic secondary school, located in the Eltham area of the Royal Borough of Greenwich in London, England.

The school was first established in 1964, and is supported by the Roman Catholic Archdiocese of Southwark. Previously a voluntary aided school administered by Greenwich London Borough Council, St Thomas More Catholic School converted to academy status in February 2015. However the school continues to coordinate with Greenwich London Borough Council for admissions.

St Thomas More Catholic School offers GCSEs, BTECs and NVQs as programmes of study for pupils. Some courses are delivered in partnership with other schools in Greenwich.

Notable former pupils
Jimmy Mizen, murder victim
Teresa Pearce, Labour Party politician

References

External links
 St Thomas More Catholic School official website

Secondary schools in the Royal Borough of Greenwich
Catholic secondary schools in the Archdiocese of Southwark
Educational institutions established in 1964
1964 establishments in England
Buildings and structures in Eltham
Academies in the Royal Borough of Greenwich